Carmen Fernandez is a Guamanian businesswoman, politician, and college administrator. Fernandez is a former Democratic senator in the Guam Legislature.

Early life 
Fernandez was born in Yona, Guam. Fernandez' father was Ignacio Taijeron Reyes. Fernandez' mother was Annie Frances Fernandez Cruz. In 1981, Fernandez graduated from George Washington High School.

Education 
In 1985, Fernandez earned a bachelor's degree in business management from the University of Guam. In 1988, Fernandez earned an MBA degree from the University of Guam.

Career 
In January 1998, Fernandez became Vice President of Administration & Finance at University of Guam.

On November 5, 2002, Fernandez won the Senatorial election and became a Democratic senator in the Guam Legislature. Fernandez began her term on January 6, 2003, in the 27th Guam Legislature.

As a businesswoman, Fernandez is the owner of Imperial Pacific International (IPI) in the Commonwealth of the Northern Mariana Islands. It operates Saipan's casinos.

In May 2007, Fernandez became President of Northern Marianas College. She replaced Acting President Danny Wyatt, who returned to his role as Dean for Academic Programs and Services. In April 2010, Fernandez was fired from her position as President of Northern Marianas College. Fernandez was succeeded by Lorraine Cabrera as the interim President.

In October 2016, Fernandez was named President of Northern Marianas College. 
In February 2018, Fernandez launched the casino management to Northern Marianas College’s workforce development programs. Fernandez's ownership of 
Imperial Pacific International (CNMI) LLC was not publicly known.

In August 2018, Fernandez resigned as President of Northern Marianas College. Frankie Eliptico was appointed the interim president.

See also 
 Michael San Nicolas - Chief of Staff for Fernandez during 27th Guam Legislature

References 

Businesspeople in the casino industry
Guamanian Democrats
Guamanian women in politics
Living people
Members of the Legislature of Guam
Presidents of Northern Marianas College
University of Guam alumni
Year of birth missing (living people)
21st-century American women
Women heads of universities and colleges